Lukiv is an urban-type settlement in Kovel Raion of Volyn Oblast in Ukraine. Population:

Economy

Transportation
Matsiiv railway station, located in the settlement, is on the railway connecting Kovel and Chełm in Poland. There is no passenger traffic.

The settlement is on Highway M07 connecting Kyiv via Kovel with the Ukrainian-Polish border. It continues across the border to Chełm and Lublin.

References

Urban-type settlements in Kovel Raion